Manouchehr Murotovich Ahmadov (born 28 October 1992) is a Tajik professional footballer who plays as a defender for Ravshan Zafarobod, and the Tajikistan national football team.

Career

Club
On 29 December 2015, Ahmadov terminated his contract with Bahraini side Al-Ahli. On 3 January 2016, Ahmadov was registered by FK Khujand for their 2016 AFC Cup campaign.
On 15 January 2019, Ahmadov signed a new contract with FK Khujand. On 18 April 2021, Ahmadov left Khujand by mutual consent.

International
Ahmadov made his debut for Tajikistan on 13 October 2015 against Jordan.

Career statistics

International

Statistics accurate as of match played 25 October 2018

References

1992 births
Living people
Tajikistani footballers
Association football defenders
Tajikistan international footballers
Tajikistan Higher League players